Al Mirghani Educational Sport Club is a Sudanese football club based in Kassala. Their home stadium is Stade Al-Merghani Kassala. They played in the second division of the Sudanese Premier League division 2.

References

External links
Team profile – leballonrond.fr
Team profile – la-liga.eu

Football clubs in Sudan